Richard Burke, 6th Earl of Clanricarde (died August 1666) was an Irish peer.

Career
Richard was the eldest son of Sir William Burke and Joan O'Shaughnessy. He was a first cousin to the previous Earl and had served under him in the royalist forces during the Irish Confederate Wars. When restored, the Clanricarde estates were heavily in debt and a great deal of litigation was ongoing between the interested parties.

Family
Richard married Elizabeth Butler, one of the many daughters of Walter Butler, 11th Earl of Ormond. It was the second marriage for Elizabeth, who was the widow of Sir Edmond Blanchville of County Kilkenny. They had two daughters: 
 Lady Margaret Bourke, who married Col. Garret Moore (d.1706)
 Lady Mary Bourke (d.1685), who married (1) Sir John Burke; and (2) Edward de Bermingham (d.1709).
Richard was succeeded, as Earl, by his brother, William.

Arms

References

Further reading
 Portumna Castle and its Lords, Michael Mac Mahon, 1983.
 Burke:People and Places, Eamon Bourke, Dublin, 1995.
 "From Warlords to Landlords: Political and Social Change in Galway 1540-1640", Bernadette Cunningham, in Galway:History and Society, 1996.

People from County Galway
1666 deaths
Richard
Year of birth unknown
Members of the Irish House of Lords
Earls of Clanricarde